Irena "Kika" Szaszkiewiczowa (née Jarochowska; 4 March 1917 – 11 August 2014) was a Polish artist, writer and blogger.

She was a performer of the Piwnica pod Baranami. Her fictional adventures were described in the comics called Szaszkiewiczowa, czyli Ksylolit w jej życiu, published in Przekrój since 1958.

During World War II, she was a member of Armia Krajowa. In 1969–2007 she lived in Norway. In 2011, she published her memoir titled Podwójne życie Szaszkiewiczowej (The Double Life of Szaszkiewiczowa). In 2013, at the age of 96, she started to run a blog Moje pierwsze 100 lat (My First 100 Years). She was at the time the oldest blogger in Poland.

On 9 August 2014, two days before her death, she was awarded with Officer's Cross of Polonia Restituta by the president of Poland. She received the order from Lesser Poland voivode Jerzy Miller during a ceremony at her apartment in Cracow.

Family
Szaszkiewiczowa was the sister of Maria Jarochowska, a writer and communist activist, and Konstanty Jarochowski, a photographer.

Bibliography
 Irena Kika Szaszkiewiczowa: Podwójne życie Szaszkiewiczowej. Wydawnictwo Literackie, Kraków 2011; .

References

External links

Polish cabaret performers
Polish bloggers
Polish women bloggers
1917 births
2014 deaths
Home Army members
Writers from Kraków
Officers of the Order of Polonia Restituta